Das Fräulein von Scuderi is an East German crime film directed by Eugen York. It was released in 1955.

Cast
 Henny Porten as  Fräulein von Scuderi
 Willy A. Kleinau as  Cardillac
 Anne Vernon as  Madelon
 Roland Alexandre as  Olivier Brusson
 Angelika Hauff as  St Croix
 Richard Häussler as  Miossens
 Mathieu Ahlersmeyer as  Louis XIV
 Alexander Engel as  La Regnie
 Hans-Peter Thielen as  Degrais
 Johannes Arpe as  Louvois
 Barbro Hiort af Ornäs as  La Matiniere
 Pat Svenson as  Hofdame
 Ruth Arnim as  Hofdame
 Alf Östlund as  Theaterdirektor

External links
 

1955 films
1950s mystery films
German mystery films
East German films
1950s German-language films
Films directed by Eugen York
Films based on works by E. T. A. Hoffmann
German black-and-white films
Films set in Paris
Films set in the 1680s
1955 crime films
Historical mystery films
1950s German films